Patrick or Pat Taylor may refer to:

 Patrick Taylor (American football) (born 1998), American football running back
 Patrick Taylor (author) (born 1941), Irish-Canadian author and doctor
 Patrick Taylor (politician) (1862–1922), Australian politician
 Patrick F. Taylor (1937–2004), founder of Taylor Energy
 Gordon Taylor (aviator) (Patrick Gordon Taylor, 1896–1966), author and aviator
 C. Pat Taylor (born 1945), president of Southwest Baptist University
 Pat Taylor (baseball) (1899–1979), American baseball player
 Patrick Taylor, actor in Assassination of a High School President

See also
 Taylor (surname)
 Hoyt Patrick Taylor (1890–1964), lieutenant governor of North Carolina
 Hoyt Patrick Taylor Jr. (1924–2018), North Carolina politician